The Scott River is a  river in Siskiyou County, California, United States. It is a tributary of the Klamath River, one of the largest rivers in California.

History
Historically, fur trappers called the river the Beaver River, before the Hudson's Bay Company nearly extirpated beaver from the area in the early 19th century. Scott Valley was first entered ( first Europeans) Stephen Meek, Thomas McKay, George Adolphus Duzel and 16 other Hudson's Bay trappers in 1836. In 1850 alone, Meek reportedly trapped 1,800 beaver in Scott Valley, which was then known as Beaver Valley. Meek, who had hunted all over the West, declared the Beaver Valley one of the best places he had ever seen to trap beaver and hunt game, and returned to retire there at the Josiah Doll ranch from 1871 until his death in 1889 at the age of 90. The 1850 discovery of gold during the California Gold Rush by pioneer John W. Scott at Scott Bar, downriver from Scott Valley, brought many prospectors into the area; Scott's discovery led to the naming of the valley and the river in his honor.

Watershed
About two-thirds of the land is privately owned and about one-third is publicly owned. About 45 percent of the land is used for forestry, grazing for 40 percent, 13 percent for cropland and the remaining 2 percent of land is used for various purposes.

Habitat and conservation
Dredges that operated in the Scott Valley between 1934 and 1950 did some of the most visible damage done during the mining era.

In Sugar Creek, a Scott River tributary that is usually ephemeral, local landowner Betsy Stapleton worked with Michael Pollock of NOAA to create "beaver dam analogues" by driving posts into the creekbed to attract beavers to build dams. Now Stapleton's reach on Sugar Creek has perennial beaver ponds while the neighboring creeks run dry in summer and fall. Pollock's method had been used successfully in Bridge Creek, Oregon where the subsequent increase in beaver dams led to a dramatic increase in rainbow trout abundance.

See also
 Scott Valley

References

External links
 Scott River Watershed Council

Rivers of Siskiyou County, California
Tributaries of the Klamath River
Rivers of Northern California
Wild and Scenic Rivers of the United States